"Sprout and the Bean" is a single by Joanna Newsom. The A-side is from her album The Milk-Eyed Mender, while the B-side, "What We Have Known", is a re-recording of the track originally appearing on the self-released Yarn and Glue EP. The CD also contains the video for "Sprout and the Bean" which was directed by Terri Timely. The song has been used in commercials and films such as The Strangers, as well as a tourism advert for Melbourne, Australia. The harp intro was also used in a Victoria's Secret ad.

In 2009, Pitchfork Media named "Sprout & The Bean" the 229th best song of the 2000s.

Track listing
 "Sprout and the Bean" – 4:42
 "What We Have Known" – 6:08

What We Have Known was later released as a 12" Single on July 19, 2011.

References

2004 debut singles
2004 songs
Drag City (record label) singles